Creatures of the deep may refer to:

Life (BBC TV series), part 8 of BBC's nature documentary series Life
Exotic Creatures of the Deep, album by Sparks released in 2008
Lost Treasures: Creatures of the Deep, album by trance DJ/producer Tiësto released in 1997